The term Eternal triangle can refer to:

 Love Triangle
 Eternal Triangle, a London Based Pop Group
 Eternal Triangle, a Jazz standard by Sonny Stitt, recorded on the album Sonny Side Up
 The Eternal Triangle, an album by trumpeters Freddie Hubbard and Woody Shaw
 The Eternal Triangle (film) is a 1917 British silent romance film